This is a list of winners of the biennial Makdougall Brisbane Prize for particular distinction in the promotion of scientific research, latterly restyled as the annually awarded Makdougall Brisbane Medal for early career achievement in the physical sciences, of the Royal Society of Edinburgh.  It is not to be confused with the similarly named award given by the Royal Scottish Society of Arts.

Makdougall Brisbane Prize
Sources (to 2002): RSE
and RSE
1859 – Roderick Murchison
1860–62 – William Seller
1862–64 – Sir John Denis Macdonald
1864–66 
1866–68 – Alexander Crum Brown and Thomas Richard Fraser (joint)
1868–70 – Not awarded
1870–72 – George Allman
1872–74 – Joseph Lister
1874–76 – Alexander Buchan
1876–78 – Archibald Geikie
1878–80 – Charles Piazzi Smyth
1880–82 – James Geikie
1882–84 – Edward Sang
1884–86 – Sir John Murray
1886–88 – Archibald Geikie (only Fellow twice awarded the prize)
1888–90 – Ludwig Becker
1890–92 – Hugh Robert Mill
1892–94 – James Walker
1894–96 – John Gray McKendrick
1896–98 – William Peddie
1898–1900 – Ramsay Traquair
1900–02 – Arthur T. Masterman
1902–04 – John Dougall
1904–06 – Jakob Karl Ernst Halm
1906–08 – David Thomas Gwynne-Vaughan
1908–10 – Ernest Wedderburn
1910–12 – John Brownlee
1912–14 – Charles Robertson Marshall
1914–16 – Robert Alexander Houstoun
1916–18 – Abercrombie Lawson
1918–20 – Joseph Wedderburn
1920–22 – William Thomas Gordon
1922–24 – Herbert Stanley Allen 
1924–26 – Charles Morley Wenyon, protozoologist
1926–28 – William Ogilvy Kermack
1928–30
1930–32 – Alexander Aitken
1932–34 – Alfred Ernest Henderson Cameron
1934–36 – Ernest Masson Anderson
1936–38 – David Meredith Seares Watson
1938–40 – Edward Lindsay Ince
1940–42 – William Wright Smith
1942–44 – Max Born and Peng Huanwu
1944–46 – William Black
1946–48 - Mowbray Ritchie
1948–50
1950–52 – Edward Maitland Wright
1952–54 – William Charles Osman Hill
1954–56 – Maurice Yonge
1956–58 – Ian Sneddon
1958–60
1960–62 – Edward McWilliam Patterson
1962–64 – Arthur Holmes
1964–66 – Daniel Edwin Rutherford
1966–68 – James Norman Davidson
1968–70 – Norman Feather
1970–72
1972–74 – David Paton Cuthbertson
1974–76 – Frederick Valentine Atkinson
1976–78
1978–80 – Walter Eric Spear
1980–82 – William Fleming Hoggan Jarrett
1982–84 – John Henderson Knox
1984–86 – Malcolm Andrew Ferguson-Smith
1988
1990
1992 – Tom Brown, University of Oxford 
1994 - Gordon Hayward 
1996 – Mike Ferguson, University of Dundee 
1998 – Weiping Lu, Heriot Watt University (67th award) 
1999 – Anne Neville – Professor, School of Mechanical Engineering, Leeds
2001 – Dario Alessi
2003 – James Wright
2005 – Colin McInnes
2007 – Andrew Baker
2009
Makdougall Brisbane Medal
2012 – Sharon Ashbrook, University of St Andrews and Rob Jenkins, University of York 
2013 - Aidan Robson, University of Glasgow 
2014 - Per Ola Kristensson and Catherine Cazin, University of St Andrews 
2015 - Stefan Hild, University of Glasgow 
2016 - Malcolm Macdonald, University of Strathclyde 
2017 - Stephen Brusatte, University of Edinburgh 
2018 - Kimberley Kavanagh, University of Strathclyde 
2019 - Martin Lavery, University of Glasgow

See also 
 List of general science and technology awards

References

Lists of award winners
Royal Society of Edinburgh
Edinburgh-related lists